Mahlatse Chiliboy Ralepelle (born 11 September 1986 in Tzaneen, South Africa), is a rugby union player for the  in Super Rugby and in the Currie Cup. His usual position is at hooker.

Career

Youth rugby

As a pupil at Pretoria Boys High School, Ralepelle played for the South African Schools team in 2002 and 2003 and went on to play for the South African Under-19 side in 2004. He once again played for the Under-19s in 2005 and also made the step up to the national Under-21 team in the same year. Ralepelle captained the Under-21s at the 2006 Under 21 Rugby World Championship in France. South Africa made it to the final of the tournament, but were defeated by 13–24 the hosts.

2005–06

While still eligible to play Under-19 rugby in 2005, Ralepelle was included in the  squad for the 2005 Vodacom Cup. He didn't make any appearances in the competition, but did captain the  side in the Under-19 Provincial Championship.

Despite having less than ten minutes of Super Rugby experience and five Vodacom Cup matches to his name, Ralepelle was included in the Springboks squad for the 2006 Tri Nations Series. Head coach Jake White named Ralepelle on the bench for the second test against  in Sydney, but he failed to make an appearance. In their next match against  in Pretoria on 26 August 2006, he came on as a late substitute to make his Springbok debut, aged just 19. He also was an unused replacement in the final two Tri Nations games.

Ralepelle was then included in the South African squad for the 2006 tour to the Northern Hemisphere. He was an unused bench replacement in the match against  and for the first Test against . Ralepelle appeared as a substitute in the second Test at Twickenham. For the last match of the tour, Ralepelle was named as captain for the match against the World XV at Walkers Stadium in Leicester, becoming the first black player - and the youngest - to captain the national team.

2007–08

He then picked up a serious knee injury that ruled him out of rugby for the remainder of the year.

After 18 months out of action with knee injuries, he returned to the field in August 2008 in the 2008 Currie Cup Premier Division, making his Currie Cup debut two-and-a-half years after he made his Super Rugby debut. With his injury problems now behind him, he made eight appearances in the Currie Cup as he helped the Blue Bulls reach the final of the competition. He played off the bench in the final, but could not prevent Durban-based side the  running out 14–9 winners.

He won back his place in the  squad, being included in their tour of Great Britain in November 2008, making one appearance in their 42–6 victory against .

2009–10

He was included in the  squad for the 2009 British & Irish Lions tour to South Africa, making one appearance, by starting the Third Test match against the Lions. He also made four appearances for the national side during the 2009 Tri Nations Series, helping South Africa win the competition for the third time.

He captained a  XV in their match against Leicester Tigers during the 2009 end-of-year rugby union internationals, with the Premiership side running out 22–17 winners, but sustained a foot injury which required a foot operation and kept him out of action for three months.

He also made five appearances during the 2010 Tri Nations Series and a further eight appearances in domestic action for the  during the 2010 Currie Cup Premier Division.

He was once again selected in the  squad that toured Great Britain and Ireland during the 2010 end-of-year rugby union internationals. However, on 15 November 2010, Ralepelle (along with winger Bjorn Basson) was suspended and sent back to South Africa following a positive drugs test after their match against , with traces of banned substance methylhexanamine found in his system. After an investigation, the South African Rugby Union found both players innocent of all charges and issued a public apology to them. Both players were given diet supplement Anabolic Nitro Nitric Oxide Extreme Energy Surge by team officials. While previous tests of this product in South Africa yielded negative results, the British version of the product did contain methylhexanamine, resulting in the positive test results.

2011–13

He made two appearances for  during the 2011 Tri Nations Series and scored his first international try in their match against  in Sydney. He made three appearances for the  during the 2011 Currie Cup Premier Division before being named in the Springbok squad that played at the 2011 Rugby World Cup.

However, despite being named in South Africa's squad, he missed out on the 2012 Rugby Championship, once again suffering a knee injury.

He made one more appearance for the Springboks, coming on as a late substitute in their match against  during the 2013 mid-year rugby union tests. In June 2013, the  announced that Ralepelle would join French Top 14 side Toulouse after the 2013 Currie Cup Premier Division season, but he failed to feature in the competition.

Toulouse and drugs ban

He made a total of ten appearances in the Top 14 and a further six in the Heineken Cup for Toulouse. His final match for them came in February 2014, when he started in their 16–6 win against , but tore his knee ligaments during the match, which ruled him out during the remainder of the season.

On 19 March 2014, Ralepelle faced an out-of-competition drugs test, where he tested positive for anabolic steroid drostanolone. The hearing into this positive drugs test was set for mid-March 2015, but Ralepelle had his contract with Toulouse cancelled and returned to South Africa. He was eventually banned for two years, for a period 10 April 2014 to 10 April 2016, effective from the date that the player's initial provisional suspension came into effect.

Return to rugby : Sharks

Durban-based Super Rugby outfit the  announced that Ralepelle would join them prior to the 2016 Super Rugby season.

8 Year Ban 

During an out-of-competition test on 17 January 2019 he tested positive for Zeranol and was banned for eight years.

References

External links
 Bulls profile
 
 Baby Boks team announced
 Red hot Chilliboy a future Bok captain
 itsrugby.co.uk profile

1986 births
Living people
People from Tzaneen
South African rugby union players
South Africa international rugby union players
Bulls (rugby union) players
Blue Bulls players
Rugby union hookers
Doping cases in rugby union
Rugby union players from Limpopo